Sabunçu is a village in the Zagatala District of Azerbaijan. The village forms part of the municipality of Lahıc.

References

External links

Populated places in Zaqatala District